The 1967 Saskatchewan general election was held on October 11, 1967, to elect members of the Legislative Assembly of Saskatchewan.

The Liberal Party of Saskatchewan, led by Premier Ross Thatcher, was re-elected with a slightly larger majority in the legislature and a larger share of the popular vote.

The Co-operative Commonwealth Federation had changed its name to the New Democratic Party to match the change that had already been made at the federal level. Still led by former Premier Woodrow Lloyd, the NDP also won an increased share of the popular vote but lost one of the seats that the CCF had won in the previous election.

The Liberal and NDP gains in the popular vote came at the expense of the Progressive Conservative Party of Saskatchewan of Martin Pederson, which lost about half of its votes. Pederson finished third in the constituency he had won three years earlier, and no other PC members were elected. However, a PC candidate finished second in Athabasca.

It was the first election in which the cities of Regina, Saskatoon and Moose Jaw were divided into two or more ridings instead of having a single city-wide multiple-member district for each city. Previously those cities had elected their MLAs through Plurality block voting, but starting in this election, the city MLAs began to be elected through First past the post.

It was the last election, as of 2020, in which the leaders of both the government and the opposition in Saskatchewan represented rural constituencies. It was also the last election contested by the Social Credit Party, which nominated six candidates. To date this is the last election in which the Saskatchewan Liberal Party won a majority of seats.

Results

|- bgcolor=CCCCCC
!rowspan=2 colspan=2 align=center|Party
!rowspan=2 align=center|Party leader
!rowspan=2|Candidates
!colspan=4 align=center|Seats
!colspan=3 align=center|Popular vote
|- bgcolor=CCCCCC
|align="center"|1964
|align="center"|Elected
|align="center"|% Change
|align="center"|#
|align="center"|%
|align="center"|% Change

|align="center"|Ross Thatcher
|align="right"| 59
|align="right"|32
|align="right"| 35
|align="right"|+9.4%
|align="right"|193,871
|align="right"|45.57%
|align="right"|+5.17%

|align="center"|Woodrow Lloyd
|align="right"| 59
|align="right"|25
|align="right"| 24
|align="right"|-4.0%
|align="right"|188,653
|align="right"|44.35%
|align="right"|+4.05%

|align="center"|Martin Pederson
|align="right"| 41
|align="right"|1
|align="right"| –
|align="right"|-100%
|align="right"|41,583
|align="right"|9.78%
|align="right"|-9.12%

|align="center"|
|align="right"| 6
|align="right"|–
|align="right"| –
|align="right"|–
|align="right"|1,296
|align="right"|0.30%
|align="right"|-0.09%
|-
|colspan=3| Total
|align="right"| 165
|align="right"|58
|align="right"|59
|align="right"|+1.7%
|align="right"|425,403
|align="right"|100%
|align="right"| 
|-
| align="center" colspan=11|Source: Elections Saskatchewan
|-

Percentages

Ranking

Riding results
Names in bold represent cabinet ministers and the Speaker. Party leaders are italicized. The symbol " ** " indicates MLAs who are not running again.

Northwestern Saskatchewan

|-
|bgcolor=whitesmoke|Athabasca
|| 
|Allan Ray Guy1,397
|
|Tony Wood602
|
|Harry J. Houghton818
|
|
|| 
|Allan Ray Guy
|-
|bgcolor=whitesmoke|Cut Knife-Lloydminster
|
|Ben Gulak2,121
|| 
|Miro Kwasnica2,862
|
|Gordon Goodfellow1,289
|
|Walter B. Hoover (Social Credit) 164
|| 
|Isidore Charles Nollet**
|-
|bgcolor=whitesmoke|Meadow Lake
|| 
|Henry Coupland2,394
|
|Martin Semchuk2,288
|
|Leo Jeannotte921
|
|
|| 
|Henry Ethelbert Coupland
|-
|bgcolor=whitesmoke|Redberry
|
|Steve Sulatisky2,343
|| 
|Dick Michayluk2,365
|
|Ed Thunderchild510
|
|
|| 
|Demitro Wasyl Michayluk
|-
|bgcolor=whitesmoke|Rosthern
|| 
|David Boldt2,950
|
|George Guenther1,466
|
|
|
|
|| 
|David Boldt
|-
|bgcolor=whitesmoke|Shellbrook
|
|Pat Moan2,204
|| 
|George Bowerman2,515
|
|Norval Horner910
|
|
|| 
|John Marcel Cuelenaere**
|-
|bgcolor=whitesmoke|The Battlefords
|
|Herbert O.M. Sparrow3,700
|| 
|Eiling Kramer4,200
|
|
|
|
|| 
|Eiling Kramer
|-
|bgcolor=whitesmoke|Turtleford
|
|John Flack2,125
|| 
|Bob Wooff2,152
|
|Hugh E. Konsmo813
|
|
|| 
|Robert Hanson Wooff

Northeastern Saskatchewan

|-
|bgcolor=whitesmoke|Humboldt
|| 
|Mathieu Breker3,693
|
|Palma Little2,881
|
|Frank J. Martin720
|
|
|| 
|Mathieu Theodore Breker
|-
|bgcolor=whitesmoke|Kelsey
|
|William John McHugh2,381
|| 
|John R. Messer2,473
|
|Carsten Johnson606
|
|
|| 
|John Hewgill Brockelbank**
|-
|bgcolor=whitesmoke|Kelvington
|| 
|Bryan Bjarnason2,440
|
|Neil Byers2,432
|
|Anita M. Kubat659
|
|
|| 
|Bryan Bjarnason
|-
|bgcolor=whitesmoke|Kinistino
|
|Lyle Rea2,724
|| 
|Arthur Thibault3,260
|
|
|
|
|| 
|Arthur Thibault
|-
|bgcolor=whitesmoke|Melfort-Tisdale
|
|Donald Lamb3,650
|| 
|Clarence George Willis4,133
|
|
|
|Orville Pederson (Social Credit) 331
|| 
|Clarence George Willis
|-
|bgcolor=whitesmoke|Nipawin
|| 
|Frank Radloff2,454
|
|Walter A. Mills2,446
|
|John A. Whittome1,185
|
|
|| 
|Frank Kenneth Radloff
|-
|bgcolor=whitesmoke|Prince Albert East-Cumberland
|
|Eldon McLachlan3,152
|| 
|Bill Berezowsky4,123
|
|
|
|
|| 
|Bill Berezowsky
|-
|bgcolor=whitesmoke|Prince Albert West
|| 
|Davey Steuart5,090
|
|Orville K. Hjertaas4,928
|
|
|
|
|| 
|David Gordon Steuart

|-

|style="width: 130px"|NDP
|Neil Byers
|align="right"|3,135
|align="right"|49.90%
|align="right"|+5.93

|Liberal
|Bryan Bjarnason
|align="right"|2,603
|align="right"|41.43%
|align="right"|-2.69

|Prog. Conservative
|Anita M. Kubat
|align="right"|545
|align="right"|8.67%
|align="right"|-3.24
|- bgcolor="white"
!align="left" colspan=3|Total
!align="right"|6,283
!align="right"|100.00
!align="right"|

West Central Saskatchewan

|-
|bgcolor=whitesmoke|Arm River
|| 
|Wilbert McIvor1,929
|
|Merle Snustead1,895
|
|Martin Pederson1,214
|
|
|| 
|Martin Pederson
|-
|bgcolor=whitesmoke|Biggar
|
|Elmer McNiven1,571
|| 
|Woodrow S. Lloyd2,916
|
|Peter Wiebe1,334
|
|
|| 
|Woodrow Lloyd
|-
|bgcolor=whitesmoke|Elrose
|| 
|George Leith3,081
|
|David Loewen2,957
|
|
|
|
|| 
|George Gordon Leith
|-
|bgcolor=whitesmoke|Hanley
|| 
|Robert Andrew Heggie2,282
|
|Robert Alexander Walker2,149
|
|
|
|
|| 
|Robert Alexander Walker
|-
|bgcolor=whitesmoke|Kerrobert-Kindersley
|| 
|William S. Howes3,499
|
|Boyd Sadler2,672
|
|
|
|
|| 
|William S. Howes
|-
|bgcolor=whitesmoke|Rosetown
|| 
|George Loken2,951
|
|Harry David Link2,446
|
|Earl Keeler862
|
|
|| 
|George Fredrick Loken
|-
|bgcolor=whitesmoke|Watrous
|| 
|Percy Schmeiser2,622
|
|Hans Broten2,557
|
|Hugh Kirk533
|
|
|| 
|Hans Broten
|-
|bgcolor=whitesmoke|Wilkie
|| 
|Joseph "Cliff" McIsaac3,817
|
|Norman Heather2,436
|
|
|
|
|| 
|Joseph "Cliff" McIsaac

East Central Saskatchewan

|-
|bgcolor=whitesmoke|Canora
|
|Ken Romuld3,170
|| 
|Al Matsalla3,386
|
|
|
|
|| 
|Kenneth Gordon Romuld
|-
|bgcolor=whitesmoke|Last Mountain
|| 
|Donald MacLennan2,425
|
|Gordon MacMurchy2,399
|
|George Richardson995
|
|
|| 
|Donald Gilbert MacLennan
|-
|bgcolor=whitesmoke|Melville
|
|James W. Gardiner3,463
|| 
|John Kowalchuk3,584
|
|Art Pelzer799
|
|
|| 
|James Wilfrid Gardiner
|-
|bgcolor=whitesmoke|Pelly
|| 
|Jim Barrie3,002
|
|Leo Larson2,753
|
|
|
|
|| 
|Leo Larson
|-
|bgcolor=whitesmoke|Saltcoats
|| 
|James Snedker3,639
|
|Charles Woolfitt2,392
|
|Cliff Obre904
|
|
|| 
|James Snedker
|-
|bgcolor=whitesmoke|Touchwood
|
|George Trapp2,713
|| 
|Frank Meakes3,002
|
|
|
|
|| 
|George Joseph Trapp
|-
|bgcolor=whitesmoke|Wadena
|
|George Fisher3,146
|| 
|Fred Dewhurst4,213
|
|
|
|
|| 
|Frederick Arthur Dewhurst
|-
|bgcolor=whitesmoke|Yorkton
|| 
|Barry Gallagher5,048
|
|Irving W. Carlson4,393
|
|
|
|
|| 
|Bernard David Gallagher

Southwest Saskatchewan

|-
|bgcolor=whitesmoke|Gravelbourg
|| 
|Leo Coderre2,385
|
|Norman Allan1,860
|
|Keith Mukelt567
|
|
|| 
|Lionel Philas Coderre
|-
|bgcolor=whitesmoke|Maple Creek
|| 
|Alexander Cameron2,683
|
|Ernie Howes1,901
|
|Marlyn K. Clary955
|
|
|| 
|Alexander C. Cameron
|-
|bgcolor=whitesmoke|Moose Jaw North
|
|Vic Cole2,725
|| 
|Gordon Snyder2,860
|
|Daniel J. Patterson1,126
|
|
|| 
|Gordon Snyder
|-
|bgcolor=whitesmoke|Moose Jaw South
|
|Harry P. Swarbrick2,415
|| 
|Bill Davies4,674
|
|Nick Markewich1,356
|
|
|| 
|William Gwynne Davies
|-
|bgcolor=whitesmoke|Morse
|| 
|Ross Thatcher3,396
|
|Louis H. Lewry2,398
|
|Earl Cooper694
|
|
|| 
|Ross Thatcher
|-
|bgcolor=whitesmoke|Notukeu-Willow Bunch
|| 
|Jim Hooker2,772
|
|Allan Engel2,216
|
|
|
|
|| 
|James Benjamin Hooker
|-
|bgcolor=whitesmoke|Shaunavon
|| 
|Fernand Larochelle3,091
|
|Robert B. Fulton2,684
|
|
|
|
|| 
|Fernand Larochelle
|-
|bgcolor=whitesmoke|Swift Current
|
|T. Lawrence Salloum3,366
|| 
|Everett Irvine Wood4,825
|
|Donald C. McGowan1,439
|
|
|| 
|Everett Irvine Wood

Southeast Saskatchewan

|-
|bgcolor=whitesmoke|Bengough
|| 
|Alex Mitchell2,408
|
|Dale Leifso2,194
|
|Jim Hall723
|
|
|| 
|Alexander Mitchell
|-
|bgcolor=whitesmoke|Cannington
|| 
|Tom Weatherald3,436
|
|Stanley G. Barnard2,377
|
|Glenn Brimner1,436
|
|
|| 
|Thomas Milton Weatherald
|-
|bgcolor=whitesmoke|Lumsden
|| 
|Darrel Heald2,812
|
|Cliff Thurston2,114
|
|Donald K. MacPherson917
|
|
|| 
|Darrel Verner Heald
|-
|bgcolor=whitesmoke|Milestone
|| 
|Cyril MacDonald2,491
|
|Fred P. Petruic1,920
|
|J.K. Glenn610
|
|
|| 
|Cyril Pius MacDonald
|-
|bgcolor=whitesmoke|Moosomin
|| 
|Frank Gardner3,297
|
|William Francis Goodwin2,435
|
|Andrew Emerson Bruce1,956
|
|
|| 
|E. Franklin Gardner
|-
|bgcolor=whitesmoke|Qu'Appelle-Wolseley
|| 
|Doug McFarlane2,990
|
|John Stephen Leier1,842
|
|Victor Edward Horsman1,401
|
|Lloyd Avram (Social Credit) 323
|| 
|Douglas Thomas McFarlane
|-
|bgcolor=whitesmoke|Souris-Estevan
|| 
|Ian MacDougall5,197
|
|Russell Brown4,335
|
|
|
|
|| 
|Ian Hugh MacDougall
|-
|bgcolor=whitesmoke|Weyburn
|
|Junior Staveley4,693
|| 
|Jim Pepper4,876
|
|Jean Benson865
|
|
|| 
|James Auburn Pepper

Saskatoon

|-
|bgcolor=whitesmoke|Saskatoon City Park-University
|| 
|Jeff Charlebois6,096
|
|Alex M. Nicholson5,410
|
|Mel Mills1,356
|
|
| colspan=2  style="background:whitesmoke; text-align:center;"|New District
|-
|bgcolor=whitesmoke|Saskatoon Mayfair
|
|Alex W. Prociuk3,576
|| 
|John Edward Brockelbank5,739
|
|Hugh Rainey1,432
|
|
| colspan=2  style="background:whitesmoke; text-align:center;"|New District
|-
|bgcolor=whitesmoke|Saskatoon Nutana Centre
|| 
|Clarence Estey6,184
|
|Wes Robbins4,902
|
|George Bateman1,170
|
|
| colspan=2  style="background:whitesmoke; text-align:center;"|New District
|-
|bgcolor=whitesmoke|Saskatoon Nutana South
|| 
|Bill Forsyth5,193
|
|Adele Smillie3,445
|
|Peter Ritchie1,267
|
|
| colspan=2  style="background:whitesmoke; text-align:center;"|New District
|-
|bgcolor=whitesmoke|Saskatoon Riversdale
|
|Margaret Gent2,327
|| 
|Roy Romanow4,888
|
|Emanuel Sonnenschein1,160
|
|
| colspan=2  style="background:whitesmoke; text-align:center;"|New District

Regina

|-
|bgcolor=whitesmoke|Regina Centre
|
|Pat McKerral2,442
|| 
|Allan Blakeney4,363
|
|Les Youngson698
|
|Nelson Falkowsky (Social Credit) 142
| colspan=2  style="background:whitesmoke; text-align:center;"|New District
|-
|bgcolor=whitesmoke|Regina North East
|
|Frank Gerein3,344
|| 
|Walt Smishek5,892
|
|Albert E. Wilson1,224
|
|
| colspan=2  style="background:whitesmoke; text-align:center;"|New District
|-
|bgcolor=whitesmoke|Regina North West
|
|Frank Kleefeld3,728
|| 
|Ed Whelan5,364
|
|George J. Tkach1,011
|
|H. Ken Cooper (Social Credit) 147
| colspan=2  style="background:whitesmoke; text-align:center;"|New District
|-
|bgcolor=whitesmoke|Regina South
|| 
|Gordon Grant6,297
|
|Jack W. Kehoe2,575
|
|Lillian Groeller487
|
|
|| 
|Gordon Burton Grant
|-
|bgcolor=whitesmoke|Regina South East
|
|Paul Dojack5,461
|| 
|Henry Baker5,893
|
|Bill Barry896
|
|
| colspan=2  style="background:whitesmoke; text-align:center;"|New District
|-
|bgcolor=whitesmoke|Regina South West
|| 
|Don McPherson5,890
|
|Murray Koskie4,076
|
|Dennis Braun1,084
|
|Henry Austin Hunt (Social Credit) 189
| colspan=2  style="background:whitesmoke; text-align:center;"|New District

See also
List of political parties in Saskatchewan
List of Saskatchewan provincial electoral districts

Further reading

References
Saskatchewan Archives Board - Election Results By Electoral Division
Elections Saskatchewan: Provincial Vote Summaries

Saskatchewan
1967 in Saskatchewan
1967
October 1967 events in Canada